David Tallant (August 24, 1896 – December 13, 1948) was a professional American football player for the Hammond Pros of the National Football League between 1921 and 1925. A tackle, he attended Grove City College and Muskingum University prior to playing professionally.

External links

American football tackles
Hammond Pros players
Players of American football from Pennsylvania
People from Murrysville, Pennsylvania
1896 births
1948 deaths